is a railway station in the town of Tomioka, Fukushima, Japan, operated by the East Japan Railway Company (JR East). Built in 1898, the station was destroyed by a tsunami in March 2011, and reopened six years later in October 2017.

Lines

Station layout
Tomioka Station has one island platform and one side platform, connected by a footbridge. The station building had a staffed ticket office until March 13, 2020. After relocating to the new station building on October 21, 2017, the Midori no Madoguchi was not set up. It has been unstaffed station from March 14, 2021.

Platforms

History

Tomioka Station opened on 23 August 1898. With the privatization of Japanese National Railways (JNR) on 1 April 1987, the station came under the control of JR East.

The station was destroyed by the tsunami from the 11 March 2011 Tōhoku earthquake. In January 2015, work started on dismantling the remains of the station building and footbridge. On 14 September 2017, a train arrived at the station for the first time in over six years. On 21 October 2017, rail services resumed between Tatsuta station and Tomioka station.

Passenger statistics
In fiscal 2018, the station was used by an average of 225 passengers daily (boarding passengers only). The passenger figures for previous years are as shown below.

Surrounding area
Tomioka was within the evacuation zone surrounding the Fukushima Daiichi Nuclear Power Plant. Residents were not allowed to stay overnight in the area for six years time after the incident due to the high radiation levels in the period.
 Tomioka Town Hall
 Tomioka Post Office
 Tomioka Fishing Port

See also
 List of railway stations in Japan

References

External links

  

Railway stations in Fukushima Prefecture
Jōban Line
Stations of East Japan Railway Company
Railway stations in Japan opened in 1898
Tomioka, Fukushima
Buildings damaged by the 2011 Tōhoku earthquake and tsunami